The North American Islamic Trust (NAIT) is based in Plainfield, Indiana, owns Islamic properties and promotes waqf (Islamic endowments) in North America. Many Muslim institutions founded by immigrants who arrived in the USA during the 1960s have roots in the Muslim Students Association where they were college activists. In the 1970s and thereafter, NAIT helped provide college students with a place to provide worship services. NAIT does not provide any financial or other monetary support to the Muslim Student Association. NAIT serves as the trustee of about 200 Islamic centers, mosques and schools. The properties of those mosques are estimated to be worth in the hundreds of millions of dollars.

On October 20, 2010, Judges Garza, Benavides, and Crone of the Fifth Circuit Court of Appeals found that the U.S. Department of Justice violated the Fifth Amendment rights of the North American Islamic Trust (NAIT), and by implication the rights of more than 300 similarly-named Muslim organizations and individuals, such as CAIR, when it included them on the publicly-filed unindicted co-conspirator list in 2007. The court also ruled that inclusion on the list was the result of "simply an untested allegation of the Government made in anticipation of a possible evidentiary dispute that never came to pass." The listing is simply part of tactical pre-trial maneuvering and not an indicator of guilt. In 2011, Attorney General Eric Holder indicated that Department of Justice officials determined after "looking at the facts and the law, a prosecution would not be appropriate." This conclusion was reached after two reviews conducted under both the Bush and Obama administrations.

Background
NAIT was established in 1973 in Indiana by the Muslim Students Association (MSA) of the United States and Canada, by some of the same Muslim Brotherhood members who started the MSA.  ISNA's President, Dr. Ingrid Mattson, is a former member of the NAIT board of directors.  A sister organization under the same name registered a few years later in the Canadian province of Ontario.

Financial services

Financing mosques and Islamic schools

NAIT offers waqf protection to properties of mosques, safeguards these community assets, and ensures their conformity to Islamic purposes. According to a report by the Council on American-Islamic Relations (CAIR), in 2000 NAIT funded an estimated 27% of the 1,209 mosques in the US.  NAIT held title to over 320 properties as of June 2003. Title to about one in four mosques in the US are held by NAIT. NAIT does not monitor, manage, or supervise any mosque, community center, school, or place of worship.

NAIT facilitates the establishment of mosques (such as the Dar Al Hijrah Islamic Center, the grounds of which were purchased on June 19, 1983, by NAIT) and Islamic schools by extending limited interest-free loans to needy communities from its investment venture called the Islamic Centers Cooperative Fund (ICCF).  About 8% of this fund goes annually to support local communities acquiring and improving mosques.  The remainder is placed in real estate and other investments.

Controversy
In 2007, federal prosecutors brought charges against Holy Land Foundation for allegedly funding terrorist activities of Hamas and other Islamic terrorist organizations.  NAIT was named as an unindicted co-conspirator in the case, along with the Council on American-Islamic Relations (CAIR) and ISNA. The Al Ahram Weekly said "Muslims are witnessing a smear campaign", and said "these groups represent the viewpoints and interests of the mainstream American Muslim community." In 2009, U.S. District Court Judge Jorge Solis found that the Justice Department violated the Fifth Amendment rights of the NAIT and CAIR in 2007 by including them on the co-conspirator list.

References

External links
NAIT website
Muslim communities in North America, Yvonne Yazbeck Haddad, Jane I. Smith, SUNY Press, 1994,  
Muslim Mafia: Inside the Secret Underworld That's Conspiring to Islamize America, "Chapter 20:  NAIT and the Economic Jihad," P. David Gaubatz, Paul Sperry, WND Books, 2009,  

Non-profit organizations based in Indiana
Islamic charities based in the United States
Book publishing companies based in Indiana
Financial services companies of the United States
Islamic organizations established in 1973